Andre Verne Marrou (December 4, 1938) is an American politician who was the third Libertarian elected to a state legislature with his election to the Alaska House of Representatives in 1984. He later served as the Libertarian Party's vice presidential nominee in the 1988 election and its presidential nominee in the  1992 election.

Life
Born in Nixon, Texas, Marrou graduated from the Massachusetts Institute of Technology in 1962.  He is the brother of American television news personality and Judge Chris Marrou.

Alaska House of Representatives
Marrou first ran for the Alaska House of Representatives in 1982, placing second in a three-way race. He was then elected to the House in 1984. One of twelve Libertarians to be elected to a state legislature, Marrou served for one term, from 1985 to 1987. Running for reelection in 1986, he lost to Claude E. "Swack" Swackhammer, a former Alaska State Trooper.  Marrou left Alaska following his 1986 defeat and moved to Las Vegas, Nevada, where he worked as a real estate broker.

1988 vice-presidential campaign

In February 1988 Marrou announced at the Libertarian Party of California's state convention that he would seek the Libertarian Party's vice presidential nomination. He was selected as the Libertarian vice-presidential nominee for the 1988 presidential election at the 1987 national convention without any opposition; on the ballot in 46 states and the District of Columbia, U.S. Congressman Ron Paul and Marrou placed third in the popular vote with 432,179 votes (0.5%), behind George H. W. Bush and Michael Dukakis. Paul and Marrou were kept off the ballot in Missouri
(due to what the St. Louis Post-Dispatch called a "technicality") and in North Carolina,
and received votes there only when written in.

1992 presidential campaign
In the 1992 election, Marrou was the Libertarian presidential nominee. In the New Hampshire primary of that year, he polled the highest vote total, 11, in Dixville Notch, New Hampshire, the first town in the state to report results. In the general election, he and running mate Nancy Lord were on the ballot in all 50 states and Washington, D.C., and received 290,087 votes (0.28%).

Marrou had most of his campaign staff resign during the summer of 1992, mainly because he was willing to accept a federal campaign subsidy in contradiction to Libertarian Party's non-coercion pledge. Several of his former campaign staffers sought to have the Libertarian Party strip him of the nomination because he had unpaid child support, had an arrest warrant in Massachusetts for an outstanding contempt of court charge, claimed to have been married twice when it was in fact four times, was being investigated for campaign improprieties from his time in Alaska, was reportedly running up unpaid credit card bills in a campaign PAC's name without their approval, and was habitually months late in making his house payments. The Libertarian Party national committee (LNC) decided to take no action for fear it would call attention to these issues.

References

External links
 Short notes on members of the 1962 MIT class
 
 
 
 Andre Marrou at 100 Years of Alaska's Legislature

|-

|-

1938 births
2023 deaths
1988 United States vice-presidential candidates
20th-century American politicians
Alaska Libertarians
Candidates in the 1992 United States presidential election
Libertarian Party (United States) officeholders
Libertarian Party (United States) presidential nominees
Libertarian Party (United States) vice presidential nominees
Massachusetts Institute of Technology alumni
Members of the Alaska House of Representatives
People from Homer, Alaska
People from Nixon, Texas
People from San Antonio
People from the Las Vegas Valley